The New Road is a historical novel by the Scottish writer Neil Munro, which was adapted as a television serial by the BBC.  Munro is now mainly remembered as the creator of the comic character Para Handy, but this is regarded as the best of his serious novels.

The novel was written in 1914 and set in 1733. The title refers to General Wade's military road through the central Highlands from Dunkeld to Inverness, symbolic of changes taking place to the Highlands at that time. The central character is Aeneas Macmaster, a young man from Inveraray who travels north to investigate his father's disappearance and presumed death 14 years earlier at the Battle of Glenshiel.

Like Munro's earlier novel John Splendid, it was a revisionist view of the period, which was critical of the cult of Highlanders and Jacobites, and was sympathetic to Clan Campbell, often seen as the villains of the period. (Munro came from Inveraray, the Campbell's capital.)  It may also be slightly derivative of Robert Louis Stevenson's novel Kidnapped, which had a similar setting, and there are parallels between some of the characters.

The BBC adapted it as a television serial, shown in April 1973 in the Sunday tea-time slot which showed fairly faithful adaptations of classic novels.  The script was written by Cliff Hanley.  There were five 45-minute episodes: "A Call to the North", "Col of the Tricks", "A Kistful of Muskets", "The Big One" and "A Balance of Accounts".

Cast
Maev Alexander as Janet Campbell
David Ashton as Aeneas Macmaster
John Grieve as Sandy Duncanson
Tom Watson as Ninian Campbell
Christine McKenna as Margaret Duncanson
David Mowat as The Muileach
Bryden Murdoch as Alan Macmaster
Jameson Clark as the Landlord.
Helena Gloag as Meg
Anne Kristen as Annabell Macmaster
Bill Henderson as the Highlander
Mary McCuster as the Slattern

References

External links
 
 review of the novel
 

BBC television dramas
1973 British television series debuts
1973 British television series endings
Scottish historical novels
1970s British drama television series